Blackburn & Snow were a folk rock duo popular early in the mid-1960s San Francisco music scene in the United States. The duo consisted of guitarist-singer Jeff Blackburn and vocalist Sherry Snow.

History
Both Blackburn and Snow were involved in the Bay Area music scene since 1964, and became romantically involved in 1965, living together in Berkeley, California and performing together in local clubs. They signed a contract in December 1965 with Kingston Trio producer Frank Werber's Trident Productions. Trident issued two Blackburn & Snow singles which were recorded in 1966: "Stranger in a Strange Land", released late December 1966 and "Time", released October 1967; the former was written by David Crosby of The Byrds, although it was credited to the fictitious Samuel F. Omar. The duo's recording of "Stranger in a Strange Land" has been called "a lost masterpiece". Snow was considered by friends in Jefferson Airplane as the replacement for the departing Signe Anderson in late 1966, however she chose to remain with Blackburn; Anderson was replaced by Grace Slick. The duo played a part in the popularization of the San Francisco Sound, performing throughout 1965–67 at venues such as the hungry i, the Fillmore Auditorium, Avalon Ballroom and Marty Balin's nightclub The Matrix. Blackburn & Snow performed at the KFRC Fantasy Fair and Magic Mountain Music Festival, a seminal rock festival in Marin County, California at the beginning of the Summer of Love.

Studio recordings
Trident Productions intended to present Blackburn & Snow as a major new find, with Frank Werber later stating "my perception was that they were going to be huge." Enough material for an album was recorded through 1966 and into the spring of 1967, with Blackburn writing nearly all of the songs. The music the duo had been performing was electric folk rock similar to their close contemporaries Jefferson Airplane, with unique harmonic interplay between the couple. Influenced by The Everly Brothers, The Beatles and Buddy Holly, Blackburn & Snow recorded a number of straight rock songs with the backing band Candy Store Prophets, as well as some country and folk flavored material. The Candy Store Prophets were also the backing band for The Monkees first album and included Larry Taylor of Canned Heat and Gerry McGee, the long-time guitarist for The Ventures who joined that band in 1968. Gary "Chicken" Hirsh, later of Country Joe and the Fish, also drummed on some tracks. Production and engineering was handled by Randy Sterling. Though many completed songs were recorded, due to wrangling between Trident and distribution partner MGM-Verve, combined with some tension between the duo and Sterling, they did not see an album released during their partnership.

Post-breakup
Following a breakup with Blackburn in 1967, Snow joined Dan Hicks and his Hot Licks as a singer. After living in Indonesia, London and Scotland, she returned to California in the 1980s as Halimah Collingwood. Broadcasting as Halimah the Dreamah on Humboldt State University-owned KHSU radio in Arcata, since 1991 she has hosted "Ethnic Excursions", a program devoted to playing and discussion of international music styles. Jeff Blackburn joined Moby Grape in the mid-seventies; with Bob Mosley he formed the Jeff Blackburn Band which with the addition of Neil Young and Johnny Craviotto became The Ducks, playing a series of impromptu bar gigs in Santa Cruz, California in 1977. During this time, Blackburn co-wrote "My My, Hey Hey (Out of the Blue)" with Young. Blackburn continued to perform, based in Santa Cruz with his band Buck N the Odds. In 1999, the mid-sixties Blackburn & Snow recordings from Trident Productions were finally released as a 20-song compact disc, titled Something Good for Your Head. 

On January 7, 2023 Collingwood announced, via her Facebook page, that Jeff Blackburn had died the previous night from undiagnosed ailments. He was 77.

References

External links
 

1965 establishments in California
1967 disestablishments in California
Musical groups from San Francisco
Musical groups established in 1965
Musical groups disestablished in 1967